Nicolas Adolphe Bellevoye (9 April 1830, Metz- 29 November 1908, Reims) was a French artist, designer and entomologist. He wrote Pour L'étude De La Tératologie De Coléoptères Imp. Chaix Plaquette  Paris 1907.

Entomological works 
 Catalogue des hémiptères du département de la Moselle, Metz, 1863
 Observations sur les Moeurs de plusieurs espèces de coléoptères vivant sur les plantes aquatiques, Metz, 1870
 Insectes qui vivent sur les tilleuls de l'Esplanade de Metz et insectes nouveaux ou rares des environs de Metz, Metz, 1870
 Mœurs des anthrénus qui vivent aux environs de Metz, Metz, 1878
 Observations sur la chaiicodoma, le magaphilus centeucularis et l'osmia biscornis aux environs de Metz, Metz, 1884
 Contributions à la tératologie entomologique, 1887
 Etude sur la fourmi domestique, monomorium pharaonis Latrille, avec planche dessinée et gravée par lui-même, Reims, 1891
 Catalogue des orthoptères des environs de Reims, Reims, 1893
 Excursion sur les promenades de Reims et visite des arbres attaqués par des insectes, 1893
 Observations sur les hoemonia dans la Marne et la Moselle, avec planche dessinée et gravée par l'auteur, Reims, 1895 
 Les plantations de pins dans la Marne et les parasites qui les attaquent en collaboration avec J Laurent, Reims, typographie et lithographie de l'Indépendant rémois, 1897
 Etudes sur les moeurs de Xyleborns Dispar, Fabr. et Saxeseni Ratz, Reims, 1899
 Supplément au catalogue des orthoptères des environs de Reims, Reims, 1901
 Les variétés de l'Hélix pomatia, Reims, 1904
 Les insectes des saules Encyclopédie des saules, par G de La Barre, 1904
 La Pyrale de la vigne, le ver coquin et les noctuelles en Champagne, Reims, 1905
 Insectes nuisibles dans la ville de Reims; la Galéruque de l'Orme, Reims, 1906
 Documents pour l'étude de la tératologie des coléoptères, Paris, imprimerie Chaix, 1908
 Observations sur le Rostellaria Geoffroyi, Watt, 1908

Sources and bibliography 
Nérée Quépat Dictionnaire biographique de l'ancien département de la Moselle, Paris, Picard, 1887 
Dictionnaire biographique de la Marne'''', 1907
Louis Demaison Notice sur M.Ad Bellevoye, Reims, Typographie et lithographie de l'Indépendant rémois, 1909 
Eugène Colon Notice sur M Nicolas-Adolphe Bellevoye, dans les Mémoires de l'Académie nationale de Metz, 1911
Elie Fleur Notice biographique sur M.AD-N Bellevoye'', Metz, imprimerie Paul Even, 1913

French entomologists
19th-century French engravers
19th-century French male artists
Natural history illustrators
1830 births
1908 deaths
Artists from Metz
Scientists from Metz